Empire Cowper was a  cargo ship that was built in 1941 by William Doxford & Sons Ltd, Sunderland, United Kingdom. She was built for the Ministry of War Transport. Empire Cowper was bombed and sunk on 11 April 1942 whilst a member of Convoy QP 10.

Description
Empire Cowper was built in 1941 by William Doxford & Sons Ltd, Sunderland. Yard number 682, she was launched on 23 September and completed in December,

Her DWT was 10,173.

The engine was built by John Brown & Co Ltd, Clydebank.

History
Empire Cowper was completed in December 1941, and placed under the management of R Chapman & Son. The Official Number 169003 was allocated, as were the Code Letters BCTF.

Empire Cowper was a member of Convoy PQ 13, which departed Loch Ewe on 10 March 1942 and arrived at Murmansk, Soviet Union on 31 March. She arrived at Reykjavík, Iceland on 16 March and departed on 20 March to join the convoy.

Empire Cowper was a member of Convoy QP 10, which departed the Kola Inlet on 10 April and arrived at Reykjavík on 21 April. Those lost on Empire Cowper are commemorated at the Tower Hill Memorial, London.

References

1941 ships
Ships built on the River Wear
Ministry of War Transport ships
Empire ships
Merchant ships of the United Kingdom
Maritime incidents in April 1942
Shipwrecks in the Barents Sea
Ships sunk by German aircraft
World War II shipwrecks in the Arctic Ocean